Duccio Degli Innocenti (born 28 April 2003) is an Italian football player. He plays as a defensive midfielder for  club Empoli.

Club career
Degli Innocenti was raised in the youth system of Empoli. He represented the club in the 2021–22 UEFA Youth League.

Degli Innocenti made his debut for the senior squad of Empoli on 6 August 2022 in a Coppa Italia game against SPAL. He made his Serie A debut on 21 October 2022 against Juventus.

International career
Degli Innocenti was first called up to represent his country for Under-17 squad friendlies in September 2019. He then played in Under-17 Euro qualifiers before the tournament was abandoned due to the COVID-19 pandemic.

He then represented Italy at the 2022 UEFA European Under-19 Championship, where Italy reached the semi-finals, and Degli Innocenti made one appearance in a group game.

References

External links
 

2003 births
Sportspeople from the Province of Arezzo
Footballers from Tuscany
Living people
Italian footballers
Italy youth international footballers
Association football midfielders
Empoli F.C. players
Serie A players